Liang Jing may refer to:
Liang Jing (actress) (born 1972), Chinese actress
Liang Jing (runner) (1989–2021), Chinese ultramarathon runner
Liang Jing (cyclist) (born 1985), Chinese track cyclist